Miguel de Oliveira (30 September 1947 – 15 October 2021) was a Brazilian middleweight boxer.

Professional career

De Oliveira was born in Sao Paulo, Brazil in September 1947. He turned pro in 1968, & amassed a record of 29-0 before facing Japanese world champion Koichi Wajima, the fight ended in a draw. Miguel would face Wojima again a year later this time losing a majority decision. In his third title attempt he scored a 15-round Unanimous Decision against José Durán at Stade Louis II, Monte Carlo, Monaco, and won the Vacant WBC Light Middleweight Title. In doing so Miguel became just the second Brazilian to win a professional boxing title after Éder Jofre. He lost the belt in his first defense to Elisha Obed.

Death

De Oliveira died from pancreatic cancer on 15 October 2021, at the age of 74.

Professional boxing record

See also
List of world light-middleweight boxing champions

References

External links

 

|-

1947 births
2021 deaths
Brazilian male boxers
Sportspeople from São Paulo (state)
20th-century Brazilian people
21st-century Brazilian people
Deaths from pancreatic cancer
Deaths from cancer in São Paulo (state)
Light-middleweight boxers
World light-middleweight boxing champions
World Boxing Council champions
People from São Manuel